Snug and Cozi is a children's slapstick comedy series that aired on the United Kingdom station ITV from 1996 to 1997. The series broadcast 13 episodes and was produced by Scottish Television Enterprises.

Format and premise 
The format of the show consists of ten-minute slapstick comedy style episodes for children's television. The principal characters are Snug and Cozi, aliens from the planet Squidge. While travelling in deep space, their pink rocket is hit by an asteroid and knocked off course. They crash land on Earth, where they are discovered by a girl named Emily, whom they befriend. She hides them in the garden shed at the bottom of her garden. Snug and Cozi speak a language called Squidge, which is gibberish to humans, but the occasional English word is recognisable.

Creation and pilot episode
The idea was dreamt up by actor and film maker, Richard Vobes in 1994, with fellow actor Nigel Cooper, when they produced a low budget pilot version of the show on 16mm film. The original concept explored the idea of aliens living in a potting shed on an allotment. When commissioned in 1996 by STV, the series was developed further to be included with a slight alteration in the name "cosy" to the spelling of Cozi in the title. The opening sequence was also altered, but incorporated some of the original animation footage of the rocket ship in the opening titles which depicted the scene of how aliens crashed on the surface of earth.

The characters never try to integrate into the environment and continue to wear their conspicuous spacesuits through the series.

Vobes was never entirely happy with the TV series as he was not allowed to direct it, and a lot of the slapstick stunts in the scripts were faked or never done. He said in an interview the only stunt they were allowed to do was riding a bed down a hill and into a car wash (In the episode 'A New Home').

Characters
 Snug, played by Richard Vobes, wears a yellow and silver spacesuit. Snug seems slightly modem-witted than Cozi, often getting things completely wrong and outed at and pushed over by Cozi.
 Cozi, played by Nigel Cooper, wears a red and silver spacesuit and he looks very similar to snug except he has a moustache. Cozi seems slightly brighter than Snug but still occasionally gets things wrong.
 Emily, played by Sarah Montgomery, is a 10-year-old girl who discovers Snug and Cozi after they had crashed on earth, she decided to look after them and keeping them away from other people by hiding them in her father's garden shed (series 1) or their summerhouse (series 2). Emily also takes Snug and Cozi on trips w, such as the seaside or her school sports day.

Popularity
The show received a 32% audience share on CITV when Britain had only four terrestrial channels. Though not widely remembered, it's available to watch on YouTube. Two series of 16 episodes aired before changes at ITV Network abruptly stopped the commission of a planned third series.

Live shows and tours
Snug and Cozi made appearances on many other CITV programmes such as Wow in 1996, Scratchy & Co. in 1997 and Timmy Towers in 1998.

In 1998, Snug and Cozi appeared in a pantomime of Cinderella at the Doncaster Civic Theatre. Their roles were as Brokers Men. No one in the audience could really understand Squidge so Snug and Cozi ate dictionaries and suddenly were able to speak English.

Snug and Cozi also did a Pink Caravan tour, where they did shows around Britain in their pink caravan. However, there were not many gigs, and on one of the shows, the Rocket Car they used set on fire, and the fire brigade had to come and put the fire out.

Merchandise
The show has never been released on VHS or DVD. A Snug and Cozi CD called 'Pink Heads' was released in 1997. To promote the CD Snug and Cozi travelled to London, England to give the Prime Minister a copy.

Richard Vobes is writing a series of Snug and Cozi children's books.

Snug and Cozi was included in a book called The Legends of Kids TV written by Garry Vaux, where Richard talked about his time on the show.

Episode guide

Unbroadcast pilot (1994)

Series 1 (1996)

Series 2 (1997)

References

External links
 Richard vobes YouTube page
 Richard Vobes website
 

1997 British television series endings
1996 British television series debuts
British science fiction television shows
ITV children's television shows
Television shows produced by Scottish Television